QSA may refer to:

 Qt Script for Applications, a scripting engine 
 Quaker Social Action
 Qualified Security Assessor, a certification by the Payment Card Industry (PCI) Security Standards Council
 Quantification Settlement Agreement, a water distribution plan
 Queens of the Stone Age, a band
 Queen's Scout Award
 Queen's South Africa Medal for service in the Boer War
 Queensland State Archives
Queer-straight alliance